The Bull Thistle Cave Archaeological Site is an archaeological site on the National Register of Historic Places, located in Tazewell County, Virginia.  It is a vertical shaft pit burial cave.  The distribution of the skeletal remains indicates that bodies were either thrown or lowered into the cave.  On the surface of the cave floor, researchers have discovered the remains of a minimum of 11 bodies. Based on an artifact recovered from the site, it is estimated that the cave was used for burials between 1300 and 1600 AD.

It was listed on the National Register of Historic Places in 1987.

References

Archaeological sites on the National Register of Historic Places in Virginia
National Register of Historic Places in Tazewell County, Virginia
Landforms of Tazewell County, Virginia
Religion
Caves of Virginia
Paleoanthropological sites